Quinto is a surname and a masculine name of Italian origin. Notable people with the name include:

Surname
 Angeline Quinto (born 1989), Filipino actress
 Angelo Quinto (1990–2020), Asian-American man killed by police
 Bong Quinto (born 1994), Filipino basketball player
 Charles Quinto (born 1990), Chilean footballer
 Egidio Quinto (1653–1722), Archbishop of Antivari
 Felice Quinto (1929–2010), Italian photographer
 Raúl Quinto (born 1978), Spanish poet
 Rufa Mae Quinto (born 1977), Filipino actress
 Ruthie Quinto (born 1968), American educator
 William Quinto (born 1937), Belizean diplomat
 Zachary Quinto (born 1977), American actor

Given name
 Quinto Maganini (1897–1974), American composer, flautist, and conductor
 Quinto Martini (artist) (1908–1990), Italian artist and writer
 Quinto Martini (politician) (1908–1975), Canadian politician
 Quinto Quintieri (1894–1968), Italian banker and politician
 Quinto Vadi (1921–2014), Italian gymnast

See also
 Quinto (disambiguation), related disambiguation page

Masculine given names
Italian masculine given names
Italian-language surnames